In Stormy Nights is the final studio album by the Japanese band Ghost. It was released by Drag City in 2007.

Track listing
The CD and LP releases of the album have slightly different track listings. These are as follows:

CD track listing

LP track listing
 "Hemicyclic Anthelion"
 "Water Door Yellow Gate"
 "Gareki No Toshi"
 "Motherly Bluster"
 "Caledonia" 
 "Grisaille"
 "Caledonia (Sing Together Mix)" (LP only)

Personnel
The following people contributed to In Stormy Nights:
 Masaki Batoh - Guitar (Acoustic), Vocals
 Takuyuki Moriya - Double Bass
 Kazuo Ogino - Analogue Synthesizer, Gaita, Kaval, Piano, Recorder (Tenor)
 Taishi Takizawa - Flute, Producer, Saxophone, Theremin, Vibraphone
 Junzo Tateiwa - Cymbals, Drums, Frame Drum, Tabla, Tympani [Timpani]

Reception

In Stormy Nights has received mostly positive reviews from critics. The album currently has a 76 out of 100 rating on the review aggregate site Metacritic, which indicates "generally favorable reviews."

Reviewer Matthew Murphy of Pitchfork Media gave the album an 8.0/10, writing "And though In Stormy Nights... can hardly be said to be a perfect work, one has to admire and celebrate Ghost's determination never to step in the same river twice." In another positive review, Allmusic's Thom Jurek called the album "A work of absolute beauty, chaos, seductive darkness and cosmic light." Andrew Gaerig of Stylus Magazine gave the album a B+, writing that In Stormy Nights "is easily their most unhinged, aggressive record; they make a show of steamrolling their subtler instincts."

Not all reviews were positive, though. Both Dusted Reviews' Matthew Wuethrich and Almost Cool's Aaron Coleman criticized the track "Hemicyclic Anthelion." Wuethrich called the track "bloated and forced," while Coleman wrote that the track "just completely derails what would otherwise be a fairly solid and concise album." In another negative review, Slant Magazine's Jimmy Newlin criticized In Stormy Nights for its lack of warmth, writing "Maybe pastiche is inevitable, even in the Japanese avant garde scene, but can't it at least be a little more fun?"

External links
 In Stormy Nights at Metacritic
 In Stormy Nights at CD Universe

References

2007 albums
Ghost (1984 band) albums
Drag City (record label) albums